Sanna Lüdi (born ) is a Swiss freestyle skier, specializing in ski cross, and a former alpine skier.

Career
Lüdi competed at the 2010 Winter Olympics for Switzerland. She placed 35th in the qualifying round in ski cross, and did not advance to the knockout rounds.

As of April 2013, her only finish at the World Championships is 9th, in 2009.

Lüdi made her World Cup debut in January 2009. As of April 2013, she has two World Cup victories, the first coming at Alpe d'Huez in 2011/12. Her best World Cup overall finish in ski cross is 4th, in 2011/12.

Anti-doping rule violation
In 2015 Lüdi was banned from sport for one year after three whereabout failures in 18 months. She will be free to compete again from 14 January 2016.

World Cup podiums

References

1989 births
Living people
Olympic freestyle skiers of Switzerland
Doping cases in freestyle skiing
Swiss sportspeople in doping cases
Freestyle skiers at the 2010 Winter Olympics
Freestyle skiers at the 2014 Winter Olympics
Freestyle skiers at the 2018 Winter Olympics
Swiss female freestyle skiers
21st-century Swiss women